The Okomu Forest Reserve is a forest block covering an area of 1081  km in Edo State, about 50  km west of Benin City, Nigeria. The Okomu National Park lies within the reserve. The park holds a small part of the forests that once covered the region, and it's the last habitat for many endangered species.

History 
The Okomu Forest Reserve was originally established by the British colonial government in 1912. In 1935, additional 411 sq km were added to the north and east, bringing the total area to 777 sq km. The reserve was intended to be managed as a source of lumber from the start, and its abundant mahogany stands have been exploited. The reserve has been actively engaged in systematic rotational logging and "taungya" farming since the 1940s. A section of forest is assigned to local farmers to be cut and farmed, then reforested with valuable tree species in this forest management scheme.

By 1984, huge swaths of the Okomu Forest Reserve had been converted to oil palm and rubber plantations, some officially, others illegally or with no oversight.

Ecotourism

Geography

References 

Forest Reserves of Nigeria